Bob Ford Field at Tom & Mary Casey Stadium is a football stadium in Albany, New York, owned and operated by the University at Albany, SUNY and hosts the school's football team, as well as their soccer program. The stadium,  with an initial seating capacity of 8,500 (originally called Bob Ford field, named after Bob Ford, who was head coach at Albany from 1970 until retiring at the end of the 2013 season, with the playing field still called that) opened on September 14, 2013, when Albany made its debut in Colonial Athletic Association football against Rhode Island. It was renamed Bob Ford Field at Tom & Mary Casey Stadium in 2015 after Tom & Mary Casey gave a $10 million gift to the school. It replaced University Field as the school's current stadium.

Features
8,500 seats, including 629 chair-backs, bleachers, and a natural grass berm.
Daktronics scoreboard with a 39’ by 22’ HD video display and point-source sound system behind the south end zone.
Press level with four luxury suites, print media area, and booths for radio, television, coaches, and replay.

Attendance records
Football

Due to growing popularity and national recognition of lacrosse, the first-ever Albany Great Danes men's lacrosse game was held at Bob Ford Field on April 18, 2015. It was the first time since March 10, 2007 that a top-10 matchup was held in the Capital District, with #4 UAlbany defeating #10 Delaware 13–7. Since then, multiple top-25 in the nation games have been held there. The official seating capacity for lacrosse at Casey Stadium is 6,394.

Most home lacrosse games are played next door at John Fallon Field (Max-Capacity 2,500)

See also
 List of NCAA Division I FCS football stadiums

References

External links
 Bob Ford Field at Tom & Mary Casey Stadium - University at Albany Great Danes

College football venues
College lacrosse venues in the United States
College soccer venues in the United States
Albany Great Danes football
Albany Great Danes men's soccer
Albany Great Danes men's lacrosse
American football venues in New York (state)
Lacrosse venues in New York (state)
Premier Lacrosse League venues
Soccer venues in New York (state)
Sports venues in Albany, New York
2013 establishments in New York (state)
Sports venues completed in 2013